Okotoks-High River was a provincial electoral district in Alberta, Canada, mandated to return a single member to the Legislative Assembly of Alberta from 1930 to 1971.

History

The Okotoks—High River electoral district was formed prior to the 1930 Alberta general election from the Okotoks electoral district, northern portion of the High River electoral district, and a small portion of the Rocky Mountain electoral district. The electoral district was named after the Town of Okotoks and Town of High River.

The Okotoks-High River electoral district would be abolished in the 1971 electoral boundary re-distribution, and merge with the northern portion of the Pincher Creek-Crowsnest electoral district to form the Highwood electoral district.

Electoral history
The first member of the Legislative Assembly elected in the Okotoks-High River electoral district was United Farmers of Alberta representative George Hoadley, who had previously held the former Okotoks electoral district through its entire history from 1909 to 1930. Hoadly would soundly defeat his Liberal opponent and former Mayor from 1928-1929 Malcolm MacGougan.

Hoadley would fail to hold the seat in the 1935 Alberta general election, falling to Social Credit candidate William Morrison. Morrison would defeat two other candidates, Liberal A. S. Dick and future Mayor of Okotoks and Conservative Victor E. Hessell. Morrison would only represent the district for a couple of weeks before resigning to provide a seat for newly confirmed party leader and Premier William Aberhart. Aberhart had convinced Morrison to resign so that he could take the seat and provide cabinet representation to southern Alberta to quell complaints about the lack of ministers for the region. Morrison's resignation occurred before the newly elected Legislative Assembly had its first sitting. Aberhart would only represent the district for one sitting, choosing to contest the 1940 Alberta general election in the Calgary electoral district.

Election results

1930 general election

1935 general election

1935 by-election

1940 general election

1944 general election

1948 general election

1952 general election

1955 general election

1959 general election

1963 general election

1967 general election

Plebiscite results

1957 liquor plebiscite

On October 30, 1957, a stand-alone plebiscite was held province wide in all 50 of the then current provincial electoral districts in Alberta. The government decided to consult Alberta voters to decide on liquor sales and mixed drinking after a divisive debate in the legislature. The plebiscite was intended to deal with the growing demand for reforming antiquated liquor control laws.

The plebiscite was conducted in two parts. Question A, asked in all districts, asked the voters if the sale of liquor should be expanded in Alberta, while Question B, asked in a handful of districts within the corporate limits of Calgary and Edmonton, asked if men and women should be allowed to drink together in establishments.

Province wide Question A of the plebiscite passed in 33 of the 50 districts while Question B passed in all five districts. Okotoks-High River voted in favour of the proposal by a wide margin. Voter turnout in the district was well above the province wide average of 46%.

Official district returns were released to the public on December 31, 1957. The Social Credit government in power at the time did not consider the results binding. However the results of the vote led the government to repeal all existing liquor legislation and introduce an entirely new Liquor Act.

Municipal districts lying inside electoral districts that voted against the plebiscite were designated Local Option Zones by the Alberta Liquor Control Board and considered effective dry zones. Business owners who wanted a license had to petition for a binding municipal plebiscite in order to be granted a license.

See also
List of Alberta provincial electoral districts
High River, a town in southern Alberta
Okotoks, a town in southern Alberta

References

Further reading

External links
Elections Alberta
The Legislative Assembly of Alberta

Former provincial electoral districts of Alberta
High River
Okotoks